Tashbih is an Islamic religious concept meaning anthropomorphism, assimilating/comparing God to His creatures. In Islamic theology, two opposite terms are attributed to Allah, tashbih and tanzih (transcendence).

However, the fuller meaning of tashbih is 'affirming similarity', i.e. affirming similarity between God and His creatures. This concept is eternally juxtaposed with Allah's tanzih (transcendence, or 'declaring incompatibility').

Both ta'til, divesting God of His attributes, and tashbih, anthropomorphism, are considered to be heresies by Sunnis. 

Tashbih were apparent in Shia teaching, particularly in the thought of Al-Qasim al-Rassi, Zaidiyyah Imam of 8 AD century.

See also 
 Tanzih
 Ta'til
 Ta'wil
 Tafwid
 Bila Kayf

References

External links 
 Tashbīh | Encyclopaedia Britannica

Anthropomorphism in Islamic theology
Islamic terminology
God in Islam
Islamic theology